Wiped Out! is the second studio album by American rock band the Neighbourhood. It was released on October 30, 2015 by Columbia Records. In late 2020, the song "Daddy Issues" went viral on TikTok, along with "Sweater Weather", a song off of the band's debut album I Love You.

Critical reception

The album received generally mixed reviews. Writing for Exclaim!, Ryan B. Patrick called the record "a "see what sticks" effort; it's slick and polished, but hits varying levels of satisfaction throughout."

Natasha West, from DIY, said that "Wiped Out! delivers a message of heartbreak, hope and heartfelt honesty" and "having successfully mixed pop, rock and hip-hop together, it seems like they have finally defined their sound as a band". A review published by Mojo Magazine, stated, "The LA quintet still sound like 16-year-old boys... Musically, though, their slick soulful pop-R&B is far more refined". For Matt Collar, from AllMusic, it "doesn't hurt that cuts like "Cry Baby," "Daddy Issues," and "Greetings from Califournia" counteract the band's somewhat downtempo vibe with catchy melodies and light, dance-oriented beats. As the black & white album cover illustration of a palm tree on a beach implies, this is surf music for street goths and beach bums with bad attitudes".

Kenneth Partridge, from Billboard, wrote, "The subtler, less stylized Wiped Out! keeps the palm-trees-at-twilight feel, but the sound is more hazy R&B than rock". David Turner, from Rolling Stone, thinks that "the warmth of "Sweater Weather" and the rest of the Neighbourhood's debut album is gone on Wiped Out!, replaced by a ponderous kind of cool". Uncut's published review was that the album is "a stylistic and conceptual vacuum."

Track listing

Charts

Weekly charts

Year-end charts

Certifications

References

2015 albums
The Neighbourhood albums
Columbia Records albums